, subtitled La Bonne Vie (The Good Life in French), is a Japanese light novel series written by Ougyo Kawagishi and illustrated by Meruchi Nanase. Ten volumes were published by Shogakukan from January 2012 to March 2015 under their Gagaga Bunko imprint. A manga adaptation was serialized in Shogakukan's Monthly Sunday Gene-X magazine from February 2014 to March 2015, and was collected into three tankōbon volumes. An anime television series adaptation by Feel aired from July to September 2014 under the title . Funimation licensed the series under the English title Jinsei - Life Consulting.

Characters

The main character. A boy with glasses that usually ends up as the straight man when dealing with his club mates at the Life counseling section. He got involved with the club when the president of the journalism club, Ayaka Nikaido, convinced him to join as a way of improving his social interactions.

A girl with glasses and member of the science club. She is very proud of her scientific knowledge, doesn't like irrational behaviors and tends to give her opinions based on science. She frequently ends up in awkward situations with Yūki (mostly thanks to Ikumi) and seems to have feelings for him, but refuses to acknowledge it. Yūki is not completely unaware of her feelings.

A member of the literature club, she is a sweet and cultured girl, but tends to over think when giving her opinions at counseling. Ikumi usually tries to grope her large bust. She comes from a wealthy and distinguished family. She has trouble speaking to her old fashioned and strict grandfather.

A very energetic girl coming from the sports club. She gives the most physical and less deeply thought counseling of the club, but sometimes her counseling complements the other's. She usually tries to pair Rino with Yuki, but frequently ends up causing awkward situations between the two. She seems to be a bit perverted, as she has groped Fumi's large bust on one occasion. She always wears spats under her skirt.

The president of the journalism club and a relative of Yūki. She convinced Yūki of directing the Life counseling section as thanks for helping her keeping her club open. She also seems aware of Rino's feelings towards Yuki.

A girl with pink hair that is the Arts club president. After her club is cancelled because of the lack of members and bonding with Ikumi, she decides to join the Life counseling section as a consultant. She tends to get overly excited when asked to paint something.

The President of the 1st Division newspaper who creates his own life counseling section in order to force Ayaka join his club. A very narcissistic person who hired students that have similar personalities (but not the same knowledges) as counterparts of the members of the 2nd Division club. After being defeated in a counseling contest with the 2nd Division, he agrees on shutting down his counseling section, but his perversion remains.

Fumi's counterpart who, just like her has large breasts.

Rino's counterpart who is also sharp-tonged.

Ikumi's counterpart (and only male counterpart) who is also hyperactive and short.

Media

Light novels
The first light novel volume was published on January 18, 2012 by Shogakukan under their Gagaga Bunko imprint. The tenth and final volume was published on March 18, 2015.

Anime
A 13-episode anime television series adaptation by Feel aired from July 6 to September 28, 2014.

Episode list

References

External links
  
 

2012 Japanese novels
Anime and manga based on light novels
Comedy anime and manga
Feel (animation studio)
Funimation
Gagaga Bunko
Light novels
School life in anime and manga
Seinen manga
Shogakukan manga
Slice of life anime and manga
Tokyo MX original programming